The Hassel Auxiliary Dam or Hassel Dam ( or Vorsperre Hassel) is an auxiliary dam or pre-dam on the Rappbode Reservoir in the Harz mountains of central Germany. It is located near Hasselfelde in the state of Saxony-Anhalt and impounds the waters of the Hassel, the eastern of the two headwaters of the Rappbode Reservoir. Together with its auxiliary dams, the reservoir supplies drinking water and is owned by the Saxony-Anhalt Dam Company (Talsperrenbetrieb Sachsen-Anhalt). 
The purpose of the auxiliary dam is to pre-clean water mechanically and biologically before it flows into the main reservoir.
Water can be collected from various heights and diverted to the reservoir.

The barrier itself is a 21 m high gravity dam. The bedrock consists mostly of grauwacke, but with some thinly laminated argillaceous shale as well.

There is a circular path around the Hassel Auxiliary Dam. The crest of the dam is accessible to pedestrians and the lake may be fished provided permission is obtained.

The Hassel Auxiliary Dam is checkpoint no. 53 in the Harzer Wandernadel hiking trail network.

See also 
 List of reservoirs and dams in Germany
 Dams in the Harz

References

External links 
 Hassel Dam at en.structurae.de 
 Saxony-Anhalt Dam Company 
 Hassel Auxiliary Dam 
 Hassel Auxiliary Dam near Hasselfelde 

Dams in the Harz
Dams in Saxony-Anhalt
Dams completed in 1960